Andrew Stopera (born September 30, 1997) is an American curler from Briarcliff Manor, New York. He is a three-time United States Junior Champion and won the silver medal at the 2017 World Junior Championships.

Career
Stopera had a prolific junior curling career, playing in the United States Junior Championships seven straight years, 2013–2019, and medaling every time. The first two seasons of his junior career Stopera played third for Scott Dunnam's team. They earned bronze at the 2013 Junior Nationals and improved to silver at the 2014 Junior Nationals.

Dunnam aged out of juniors after the 2013–14 season and Stopera joined the United States Curling Association's (USCA) Junior High Performance Program. Stopera was added to the Korey Dropkin rink at the lead position, joining Tom Howell, Mark Fenner, and alternate Luc Violette. Despite the new team, the result at the 2015 Junior Nationals was a familiar one, another silver medal. The team also competed in the United States Men's Championship, where they finished 7th. The next season, Stopera formed a new team, adding Luc Violette at third, Steven Szemple at second, and William Pryor at lead. The new lineup earned bronze at the 2016 Junior Nationals.

For the 2016–17 season, Team Stopera got a new front end, with Ben Richardson joining at second and Graem Fenson at lead. This line-up won the next three United States Junior Championships, 2017–2019. Winning Junior Nationals earned them the chance to represent the United States at the World Junior Championships. At their first appearance, the 2017 Worlds, they earned the silver medal when they lost to Lee Ki-jeong's South Korean team in the final. At the 2018 Worlds they made it to the bronze medal match but lost to Team Switzerland. Stopera finished fifth at his final Worlds in 2019.

Stopera played at the Winter University Games (WUG) twice as a junior, in 2017 and 2019. He played as alternate for Alex Leichter's team at the 2017 Games, finishing in sixth place. Two years later, Stopera returned to the WUG as skip but again came up short, finishing in eighth place.

After aging out of juniors Stopera joined Todd Birr's team for the 2019–20 season, playing third. For that season he also remained in the USCA's High Performance Program as a mixed doubles athlete competing with Madison Bear. For the 2020–21 season Stopera joined Rich Ruohonen's men's High Performance Program team as vice-skip. Stopera also was selected, along with teammate Madison Bear, to be the first U-25 mixed doubles national team. The U-25 team program, which stands for under 25 years old, was added in 2020 as a new part of the High Performance Program with the intention of bridging the development gap between juniors and adult-level curling.

Personal life
Stopera's father Bill is also a curler, and won the United States Men's Championship in 2012. Andrew graduated from Northwestern University.

Teams

Men's

Mixed doubles

References

External links

Living people
1997 births
American male curlers
Sportspeople from New York (state)
Competitors at the 2017 Winter Universiade
Competitors at the 2019 Winter Universiade
People from Briarcliff Manor, New York
Hackley School alumni
Northwestern University alumni